Gonocephalus interruptus, Boulenger's forest dragon or Mindoro anglehead, is a species of agamid lizard. It is found in the Philippines.

References

Gonocephalus
Reptiles of the Philippines
Reptiles described in 1885
Taxa named by George Albert Boulenger